Pearly is an unincorporated community in Buchanan County, Virginia, in the United States.

History
A post office was established at Pearly in 1903, and remained in operartion until it was discontinued in 1958. Pearly was the name of an area woman.

References

Unincorporated communities in Buchanan County, Virginia
Unincorporated communities in Virginia